The Additional Civil Lord of the Admiralty  or formally the Office of the Additional Civil Lord of the Admiralty sometimes called the Department of the Additional Civil Lord of the Admiralty was a member of the Board of Admiralty first from 1882 to 1885 and then again from 1912 to 1919 who was mainly responsible for administration of contracts for matériel for the Fleet,  supervision of the contracts and purchase department and general organisation of dockyards within the Admiralty.

History
On 14 April 1882, George W. Rendel, a renowned civil engineer working for both the Elswick Ordnance Company and the Armstrong Whitworth Shipbuilding Company, was appointed as an Additional Civil Lord on the Board of Admiralty. The post was sometimes styled Extra-Professional Civil Lord  or Second Civil Lord  during the periods in question. The post holder was usually held by a person who was neither a naval officer or a politician it existed briefly until 1885 before being abolished. In 1912 the post was re-established and usually held by one person. In 1917 due to the increasing workload of the Civil Lord of the Admiralty extra civil lords were added however they were restyled as Second Civil Lord, Third Civil Lord and Fourth Civil Lord until 1919 when the office was once again abolished.

Responsibilities
As of April 1882, the holder's responsibilities included (duties shared with Controller of the Navy):
 Dockyards.
 Steam Reserves.—as regard Ships.
 Shipbuilding.
 Constructor's Department.
 Store Department.
 Dock-yard Craft.
 Inventions and Experiments in Ships and Steam.
 Gunnery as relates to Materiel.
 Promotions and transfers of Professional Officers and Workmen in the Dockyards.

Additional as of September 1912.
 Contracts for Matériel for the Fleet (including Ships and their Machinery, Armour, Naval Ordnance and Gun Mountings, Aeroplanes and Airships), Works, Yard Machinery, and Stores of all descriptions. Contract arrangements in connection with the disposal, salvage, or loan of vessels or stores.  
 Superintendence of the Contract and Purchase Department.

NOTE.—Tenders for Ship's Hulls and Propelling Machinery, Armour, and important Gun and Air-craft Orders, will also be marked to the Third Sea Lord.
General organisation of Dockyards, including provision of Labour and Plant, and all business questions in connection with the building and repair of ships and their machinery, whether in the Dockyards or in Private Yards.

Additional as of August 1916.

 Contracts for Matériel for the Fleet (including Ships and their Machinery, Armour, Naval Ordnance and Gun Mountings, Aeroplanes and Airships), Works, Yard Machinery, and Stores of all descriptions. Contract arrangements in connection with the disposal, salvage, or loan of vessels or stores. Superintendence of the Contract and Purchase Department.
 General organisation of Dockyards, including provision of Labour and Plant, and all business questions in connection with the building and repair of ships and their machinery, whether in the Dockyards or in Private Yards.

NOTE.—Important questions relating to repair of ships and questions of general administration which may affect progress on ships building or under repair will be marked also to the Third Sea Lord.
NOTE.—Tenders for Ship's Hulls and Propelling Machinery, Armour, and important Gun and Aircraft Orders, will also be marked to the Third Sea Lord.

Additional Civil Lords of the Admiralty
Included: 
 Mr. George Wightwick Rendel,  April, 1882 –  July, 1885. 
The Right Honourable Sir Francis J. S. Hopwood, January, 1912 - 1917.
 Sir. Arthur Francis Pease, January, 1917 - January 1918.

Second Civil Lord
 Sir. Arthur Francis Pease, January 1918 - 1919.

Third Civil Lord
 Sir. Robert S. Horne, 1918 - 1919

Fourth Civil Lord
 Victor Bulwer-Lytton, Earl of Lytton, 1918-1919.

Departments under the additional civil lord
 Constructors Department
 Contract and Purchase Department
 Naval Works Department (administration of the programme of the works department).

References
Citations

Sources
 Archives, National (1882), Distribution of Business in docket Distribution of Business: Board of Admiralty. ADM 1/6330. UK.
 Blakeley, Fred M. Walker ; foreword by Trevor (2010). Ships & shipbuilders : pioneers of design and construction. Barnsley: Seaforth, published in association with the Royal Institution of Naval Architects. .
  Greene, Sir William Graham (Secretary of the Admiralty), (1917) "The Board of Admiralty. Distribution of Business". Copy in Greene Papers. National Maritime Museum, GEE/2. UK.
 Government, H.M. (January 1919). Admiralty: Board of Admiralty. The Navy List: corrected to 18 December 1918. London. H.M. Stationery Office. England.
 Jellicoe, Earl John Rushworth Jellicoe (1921). The Crisis of the Naval War. Library of Alexandria. .
 Marder, Arthur J. (2014). From the Dreadnought to Scapa Flow: Volume IV 1917, Year of Crisis. Seaforth Publishing. .
  Laviers, Eleanor; Mckillop-Mash, Charlotte. Papers of Francis John Stephens Hopwood, Baron Southborough. Bodleian Library, University of Oxford, 2007. www.bodley.ox.ac.uk
 Rodger. N.A.M. (1979). The Admiralty (offices of state). T. Dalton. Lavenham. .
 Smith, Gordon (2014). British Admiralty Part 2 - Changes in Admiralty Departments, 1913-1920, http://www.naval-history.net/.

Attribution
Primary source for this article is by  Harley Simon, Lovell Tony, (2016), Additional Civil Lord of the Admiralty (Royal Navy), dreadnoughtproject.org, http://www.dreadnoughtproject.org.

External links

Royal Navy
Royal Navy appointments
1882 establishments in the United Kingdom
1885 disestablishments in the United Kingdom
1912 establishments in the United Kingdom
1919 disestablishments in the United Kingdom